The Democratic Front for the Reunification of Korea, also known as the Democratic Front for the Reunification of the Fatherland (DFRF) or the Fatherland Front, is a North Korean popular front formed on 22 July 1946 and led by the Workers' Party of Korea (WPK). It was initially called the North Korean Fatherland United Democratic Front.

Initially 72 parties and social organizations, from both the North and the South, comprised the front. Today it has 24 members. The three political parties of North Korea—the WPK, the Korean Social Democratic Party, and the Chondoist Chongu Party—all participate in the front. The four most important mass organizations—the Socialist Patriotic Youth League, Socialist Women's Union of Korea, General Federation of Trade Unions of Korea, and Union of Agricultural Workers of Korea—are also members. The Korean Children's Union is also a member organization.

All candidates for elective office must be members of the front, and are elected by it; mass meetings are held to decide which candidates will be nominated and their names can go on the ballot paper only with the approval of the meeting. In practice, however, the minor parties and mass organizations in the front are completely subservient to the WPK. The WPK is thus able to predetermine the composition of the Supreme People's Assembly (SPA).

There is an ostensible South Korean counterpart for the DFRK, known as the Anti-Imperialist National Democratic Front, which operates in North Korea.

The current Director of the Secretariat of the Central Committee of the DFRK is Maeng Kyong-il. Members of the Presidium of the Central Committee include Pak Myong-chol and Kim Wan-su.

History

The South Korean National Democratic Front was founded with the Communist Party of Korea at its centre on 15 February 1946. It was formed from 40 leftist parties and consisted of 398 communists led by Lyuh Woon-hyung, Pak Hon-yong, and Ho Hon. The North Korean National Democratic Front was founded with the Workers' Party of North Korea at its centre on 22 July 1946. It was formed from 13 organizations and led by Kim Il-sung, Kim Tu-bong, and Choe Yong-gon. The North Korean National Democratic Front absorbed the South Korean National Democratic Front on 25 June 1949, after South Korea outlawed the latter.

In 2018, DFRK had Pak Myong-chol as its leader. Presidium members during that time included Ri Kil-song and Kim Wan-su.

Members

Political parties

Other organizations

Electoral history

Supreme People's Assembly elections

See also 

Elections in North Korea
List of political parties in North Korea

Notes

References

Citations

Sources

Further reading

1946 establishments in Korea
Organizations established in 1946
Popular fronts of communist states
Workers' Party of Korea
Korean nationalist organizations
Political party alliances in Asia
Juche political parties